Krzysztof Kazimierz Kosedowski (born December 12, 1960 in Tczew) is a retired boxer from Poland, who won the bronze medal in the featherweight division (– 57 kg) at the 1980 Summer Olympics in Moscow, Soviet Union. In the semifinals he was beaten by eventual silver medalist Adolfo Horta of Cuba after walk-over.

Kosedowski's brothers Dariusz Kosedowski and Leszek Kosedowski also boxed for Poland in the Olympic games.

Kosedowski played in movie: Chłopaki nie płaczą.

1980 Olympic results 
Round of 64: bye
Round of 32: Defeated Gu Yong-ju (North Korea) by decision, 5-0
Round of 16: Defeated Dejan Marovic (Yugoslavia) by decision, 4-1
Quarterfinal: Defeated Sydney dal Rovere (Brazil) by decision, 5-0
Semifinal: Lost to Adolfo Horta (Cuba) by walkover (was awarded bronze medal)

References
 databaseOlympics
 Polish Olympic Committee
 kosedowski's blog

1960 births
Living people
Featherweight boxers
Boxers at the 1980 Summer Olympics
Olympic boxers of Poland
Olympic bronze medalists for Poland
People from Tczew
Olympic medalists in boxing
Medalists at the 1980 Summer Olympics
Sportspeople from Pomeranian Voivodeship
Polish male film actors
Polish male boxers